The second season of the Fox American television psychological thriller series The Following premiered on January 19, 2014 and concluded on April 28, 2014, with a total of 15 episodes.

Plot 
The second season centers on former FBI agent Ryan Hardy (Kevin Bacon) and his niece, NYPD detective Max Hardy (Jessica Stroup) and their attempts to find serial killer Joe Carroll (James Purefoy) following Joe's faked death. After a new group, led by Lily Gray (Connie Nielsen) and her sons Mark and Luke (Sam Underwood), begins to develop and make public statements to lure Joe out of his hiding, Mike Weston (Shawn Ashmore) is re-recruited in order to find the new potential cult and teams with Ryan and Max to track down Joe and Lily.
Meanwhile, Joe is back to his old ways as he, along with his right-hand Emma (Valorie Curry), begin to draw plans to turn a new group of followers to his will. Things take a turn when Joe's ex-wife and the woman Ryan had an affair with, Claire Matthews (Natalie Zea), again enters the picture after Ryan and Joe believed her to be dead.

Cast

Main cast
 Kevin Bacon as Ryan Hardy, a former FBI agent (15 episodes)
 Shawn Ashmore as Mike Weston, a young FBI agent (15 episodes)
 Valorie Curry as Emma Hill, a follower and close friend of Joe Carroll (14 episodes)
 Sam Underwood as Luke and Mark Gray, twins that are both followers and sons of Lily Gray (12 episodes)
 Jessica Stroup as Max Hardy, niece of Ryan Hardy and a New York City Police Department detective (13 episodes)
 Tiffany Boone as Mandy Lang, daughter of Judy, and daughter-figure to Joe Carroll (11 episodes)
 Natalie Zea as Claire Matthews, Joe Carroll's ex-wife and long-time love interest of Ryan Hardy (8 episodes)
 Connie Nielsen as Lily Gray, once-admirer of Carroll, and mother to Luke and Mark (10 episodes)
 James Purefoy as Joe Carroll, a former professor turned serial killer and cult leader (15 episodes)

Recurring
 Valerie Cruz as Agent Gina Mendez, head of the investigation on Carroll and the new cult formed a year after his supposed death (8 episodes)
 Sprague Grayden as Carrie Cooke, a tabloid reporter and author of The Havenport Tragedy (8 episodes)
 Shane McRae as Robert, a leader in the Korban cult (8 episodes)
 Mackenzie Marsh as Tilda, Korban member and follower of Carroll (6 episodes)
 Felix Solis as Agent Clarke, FBI agent (6 episodes)
 Camille De Pazzis as Gisele, a follower of Lily Gray, working closely with Luke and Mark (5 episodes)
 Kyle Barisich as Hopkins, FBI information and computer specialist (5 episodes)
 Montego Glover as Agent Lawrence, FBI information and computer specialist (5 episodes)
 Susan Heyward as Hannah, one of Joe Carroll's followers (5 episodes)
 John Lafayette as Marshal Scott Turner, former head of the Marshal's detail participating in the investigation of Carroll's cult; provides protection for Claire Matthews (4 episodes)
 Tom Cavanagh as Kingston Tanner, televangelist who denounces Carroll (4 episodes)
 Carter Jenkins as Preston Tanner, Kingston Tanner's son (4 episodes)
 Carrie Preston as Judy, admirer of Carroll with whom Carroll lives for a year after going into hiding; Judy's daughter regards Joe Carroll as a father figure (3 episodes)
 Bambadjan Bamba as Sami, Lily Gray's illegitimate son (3 episodes)
 Rita Markova as Radmilla, Lily Gray's illegitimate daughter (3 episodes)
 Jacinda Barrett as Julia, Micah's wife and second-in-command of Korban (3 episodes)
 Jake Weber as Micah, the leader of the Korban cult (3 episodes)
 J.D. Williams as Carlos, a follower of Carroll, working closely with Luke and Mark (3 episodes)
 Josh Salatin as Lucas, Korban member and follower of Carroll (3 episodes)
 Liza de Weerd as Angela, Korban member and follower of Carroll (3 episodes)
 Leslie Bibb as Jana Murphy, Gina Mendez's ex-partner, follower of Joe Carroll (2 episodes)
 Gregg Henry as Dr. Arthur Strauss, Joe Carroll's mentor and introducer to killing (2 episodes)

Episodes

Ratings

References

External links 
 
 

2014 American television seasons
The Following